Sink Branch is a stream in Shelby County in the U.S. state of Missouri. It is a tributary of North Fork Salt River.

Sink Branch was named for the fact it is a losing stream on part of its course.

See also
List of rivers of Missouri

References

Rivers of Shelby County, Missouri
Rivers of Missouri